Top Chef: World All-Stars is the twentieth season of the American reality television series Top Chef. Initial details about the season were released by Bravo and NBCUniversal on August 1, 2022, with filming beginning the same month. The majority of the competition was shot in London, with the season finale set in Paris, marking the first time the show has been filmed entirely abroad. The cast includes past contestants from several international editions of Top Chef. Throughout the season, Padma Lakshmi, Tom Colicchio, and Gail Simmons will be joined by judges from the international editions, in addition to global culinary experts. The winner receives . It premiered on March 9, 2023.

Production
According to Simmons, the concept for Top Chef: World All-Stars had been in the works for over two years. After filming had wrapped up for the finale of Top Chef: All-Stars L.A. in Tuscany, Magical Elves Productions' executive producers and showrunner flew to Paris to meet with Bravo executives and representatives from the twenty-nine global adaptations of Top Chef. Over a two to three-day conference, the producers shared their experiences, best practices, and challenges with shooting their respective versions of the show. As a result of the meeting, Magical Elves Productions formed the idea of drawing talent from the international editions for the American series' milestone twentieth season. 

Once World All-Stars was greenlit, the decision was made to move production outside of the United States to match the international theme. Several destinations were considered, including Italy, Spain, and France. Lakshmi stated that London was ultimately chosen due to its abundance of different produce, meat, and ingredients, as well as its high population of immigrant cultures and ethnicities. The city also acted as neutral territory, as producers felt that filming in the US would give the American chefs an advantage against their foreign competitors. The casting team sought for diversity in the shows, countries, and cuisines the contestants would represent. They also attempted to recruit as many previous winners and runners-up as possible. 

The Top Chef kitchen was built in a studio located just outside of Richmond, London. The  set was designed by production designer James Pearse Connelly, who took inspiration from British pubs, Harrods Food Hall, and Big Ben. Grocery shopping took place at a Whole Foods Market in Kensington. The production crew arrived in July 2022, staying at the Kimpton Fitzroy London Hotel, and began shooting in August.  Challenge locations included Kew Gardens, Alexandra Palace, Highclere Castle, and Tottenham Hotspur Stadium. Filming then concluded with a two-episode finale in Paris.

Contestants
World All-Stars features sixteen contestants, consisting of former winners and finalists from the American series and various other localized versions of Top Chef from around the globe. The competing chefs represent a total of eleven different iterations of the show.

Contestant progress

: The chef(s) did not receive immunity for winning the Quickfire Challenge.
 (WINNER) The chef won the season and was crowned "Top Chef World All-Star".
 (RUNNER-UP) The chef was a runner-up for the season.
 (WIN) The chef won the Elimination Challenge.
 (HIGH) The chef was selected as one of the top entries in the Elimination Challenge, but did not win.
 (IN) The chef was not selected as one of the top or bottom entries in the Elimination Challenge and was safe.
 (LOW) The chef was selected as one of the bottom entries in the Elimination Challenge, but was not eliminated.
 (OUT) The chef lost the Elimination Challenge.

Episodes

Last Chance Kitchen

References

External links
 Official website

Top Chef
2023 American television seasons
Television shows set in London
Television shows filmed in England
Television shows filmed in Paris